K. L. Jubilee School & College is a private school in Dhaka, the capital of Bangladesh. The school offers education for students ranging from kindergarten to twelfth grade. Zamindar  founded the school in 1866 after his name. He named the school after himself.

Notable alumni
 Brojen Das, swimmer
 Meghnad Saha, astrophysicist
Manohar Aich, bodybuilder

References

Old Dhaka
Schools in Dhaka District
1866 establishments in India
Educational institutions established in 1866